This is a timeline of the history of the city of Buenos Aires, Argentina.

Prior to 19th century

 1536 – First foundation of the city by Pedro de Mendoza.
 1542 – City attacked by indigenous people and settlers abandon it, moving to Asunción.
 1580 – Second foundation of the city around fort built by Juan de Garay.
 1591 – Dominican monastery established.
 1604 – San Francisco monastery established.
 1611 – Men's Hospital founded.
 1620 – Town becomes capital of Buenos Aires Province.
 1671 – Cathedral inaugurated.
 1711 – Cabildo built.
 1716 – Granted the royal motto Most Noble and Loyal ("Muy Noble y muy Leal")
 1720 – Recoleta church built.
 1722 – Completion of Saint Ignatius Church
 1727 – San Miguel church founded.
 1743 – Women's Hospital established.
 1744 – Las Monjas convent founded.
 1749 – San Juan convent established.
 1752 – Cathedral built.
 1755 – Female Orphan School established.
 1763 – Anglo-Portuguese invasion, part of the Seven Years' War, repelled by Viceroy Cevallos.
 1768 – Merced church built.
 1776 – City becomes capital of Viceroyalty of the Río de la Plata.
 1778 – "Free trade regulations" in effect.
 1779 – Foundling Asylum established.
 1794 – Consulado (merchant guild) established.

19th century

1800s-1840s
 1801 - Telégrafo Mercantil newspaper begins publication.
 1806 - British briefly in power.
 1810
 18–25 May: May Revolution.
 State Library established.
 1811 – Pirámide de Mayo monument built on the Plaza de Mayo.
 1815 – Academy of Jurisprudence founded.
 1821 – University of Buenos Aires founded.
 1822
 Academy of Music founded.
 Street names changed.
 Northern Cemetery established.
 1823 – Museum of Buenos Ayres, Sociedad de Beneficencia, and Philharmonic Association founded.
 1829 – British Library established (approximate date).
 1832 – English Cemetery established.
 1833 – Victoria Theatre built.
 1838
 28 March: French blockade of the Río de la Plata begins.
 Scotch Church built.
 1840 – French blockade of the Río de la Plata ends.
 1841 – Foreign Club established.
 1845 – Anglo-French blockade of the Río de la Plata begins.
 1847 – Lutheran Church built.

1850s–1890s

 1850 – Anglo-French blockade of the Río de la Plata ends.
 1852
 Board of Health, Faculty of Medicine, and Club del Progreso founded.
 Yellow fever epidemic.
 1853
 City becomes capital of State of Buenos Aires.
 Germania club founded.
 1854 – Buenos Aires Stock Exchange, Society of Natural History of the Plate, and Gymnastic Club founded.
 1855 – Custom house built.
 1856
  built.
 Irish Convent of Sisters of Mercy established.
 1857
 Teatro Colón opens.
 Deaf and Dumb Institute founded.
 Buenos Aires Western Railway inaugurated.
 1858
 Café Tortoni in business.
 Poor Asylum, School of Catedral al Sur, and Maua Bank established.
 School of medicine built.
 Yellow fever epidemic.
 1859 – British Hospital and Convalecencia built.
 1860
 Plaza del Retiro laid out.
 Catedral al Norte (school) and Club del Plata founded.
 Santa Catalina church built.
 1861
 City becomes part of Argentine Confederation again.
 Plaza del Parque public garden laid out.
 Teutonia club founded.
 Mercado del Comercio and Episcopal palace built.
 1862
 Buenos Aires Great Southern Railway opened.
 Plaza Libertad laid out.
 Archbishop's Palace built.
 French Hospital and Irish Hospital established.
 1863
 Congress-hall and Italian Hospital built.
 London and River Plate Bank established.
 Tram service starts.
 1864
 Franco Argentine Theatre in business.
 Lorea market, German Singing Academy, and Concordia club established.
 Buenos Aires Cricket & Rugby Club opened.
 1865
 Constitución railway station opens.
 Coliseum concert-hall built.
 Kranken-verein and Heimath club founded.
 1866 – Archepiscopal see and Mercado de Independencia established.
 1867
 Cholera epidemic.
 German Hospital Society, Mercado del Norte, and Thalia club founded.
 1868
 Congregación Israelita Argentina founded.
 Sanitary Institute opens.
 1869
 La Prensa newspaper begins publication.
 Population: 177,767.
 1870 – Yellow fever epidemic.
 1871
 Yellow fever epidemic.
 City fire department established.
 1873 – A la Ciudad de Londres department store in business.
 1875 – Parque Tres de Febrero inaugurated.
 1876 – Sociedad Estímulo de Bellas Artes (art society) and Buenos Aires Orchestral Society organized.
 1877
 National Penitentiary inaugurated.
  in business.
 1879
  (theatre) opens.
 Rivadavia Library founded.
 1880 - City separated from Buenos Aires Province;  established.
 1882
 Once railway station opens.
 National Theatre built.
 South American Continental Exhibition held.
 1887
 Belgrano and Flores become part of city.
 Constitución railway station rebuilt.
 1888
 Buenos Aires Zoo established.
 Pizzurno Palace built.
 1890 - National Historical Museum opens.
 1891 – Rivera Indarte Theatre opens.
 1893 – Buenos Aires City Hall built.
 1894
 Palacio de Aguas Corrientes built.
 Musical Mutual Society organized.
 1895
 Museo Nacional de Bellas Artes opens.
 Population: 663,854.
 1897 – Puerto Madero constructed.
 1898
 Buenos Aires Botanical Garden inaugurated.
 Casa Rosada re-built.

20th century

1900s–1940s
 1901 – Club Atlético River Plate formed.
 1904
 Monument to Giuseppe Garibaldi inaugurated.
 Population: 950,891.
 1905
 Club Atlético Boca Juniors formed.
 Population: 1,025,653.
 1906 – Congress hall built.
 1908 – Avenida Theatre opens.
 1909 – San Martín Palace built.
 1910
 Exposición Internacional del Centenario held.
 Customs House, Palace of Justice, and Congressional Plaza inaugurated.
 1911 – Hotel de Inmigrantes built.
 1912 – Cine Atlas Belgrano opens.
 1913
 Buenos Aires Underground begins operating.
  newspaper begins publication.
 1914
 Harrods Buenos Aires in business.
 Population: 1,575,814.
 1915 – Retiro railway station opens.
 1916 – Buenos Aires Stock Exchange built.
 1917 – Confitería El Molino in business.
 1919
 January: Tragic Week conflict.
 Teatro Gran Splendid opens.
 1921 – Cervantes Theatre opens.
 1922 – Cine Catalunya opens.
 1923 – Palacio Barolo built.
 1925 – Puerto Nuevo opens.
 1936
 Kavanagh Building constructed.
 Maldonado Stream tubed (approximate date).
 Obelisco built.
 1937 – Teatro Gran Rex opens.
 1938 – Estadio Monumental opens.
 1945 – 17 October: Labor demonstration.
 1946 – Buenos Aires Philharmonic founded.
 1947 – Population: 2,981,043 city; 4,603,035 urban agglomeration.
 1948
 Aeroparque Jorge Newbery opens.
 Buenos Aires Great Southern Railway & Buenos Aires Western Railway closed.
 1949 – Ministro Pistarini International Airport built.

1950s–1990s
 1950 – Alas Building constructed.
 1955
 16 June: Bombing of Plaza de Mayo.
 Revolución Libertadora.
 1957 – Federico Lacroze railway station opens.
 1958 –  inaugurated.
 1962 – 11 June: Villa Soldati level crossing train accident.
 1967 – Buenos Aires Japanese Gardens open.
 1968 – Galileo Galilei planetarium opens.
 1971 – Florida Street pedestrianized.
 1972 – Bombing of Sheraton Hotel.
 1973 – 20 June: Peronist shooting near Ezeiza Airport.
 1974 – Population: 2,976,000 city; 8,925,000 urban agglomeration.
 1975
 Buenos Aires International Book Fair begins.
 Bombing of theatre.
 1976
 24 March: Coup d'état.
 2 April: Osvaldo Cacciatore becomes mayor.
 1977 – 30 April: Demonstrations by Mothers of the Plaza de Mayo begin.
 1978 – Argentine Council for International Relations founded.
 1979
 11 December: 1979 Copa América football tournament held.
 Caseros Prison built.
 1980 – Centro Cultural Recoleta inaugurated.
 1982 – June: Catholic Pope John Paul II visits city.
 1987
 April: Catholic Pope John Paul II visits city.
 12 July: 1987 Copa América Final football tournament held.
 1988 – Patio Bullrich shopping centre opens.
 1991
 Galerías Pacífico shopping centre opens.
 Population: 2,960,976 city; 10,686,163 urban agglomeration.
 1992
 17 March: Bombing of Israeli embassy.
 National Library building inaugurated.
 1994 – 18 July: Bombing of Argentine Israelite Mutual Association building.
 1996
  established per 1994 amendment of the Argentine Constitution.
 30 June: Mayoral election takes place.
 1999
 Buenos Aires International Festival of Independent Cinema begins.
 Abasto de Buenos Aires shopping mall opens.
 2000
 King Fahd Islamic Cultural Center inaugurated.
 El Ateneo Grand Splendid bookshop in business.
 Aníbal Ibarra becomes Chief of Government of city.

21st century

2000s
 2001
 Latin American Art Museum of Buenos Aires inaugurated.
 Buenos Aires Fashion Week and Creamfields BA music festival begin.
 Eloísa Cartonera founded.
 December: Economic protest.
 2002
 June: Economic protest.
 Quilmes Rock music festival and Buenos Aires Jazz Festival begin.
 2004 – 30 December: República Cromañón nightclub fire.
 2005
 Appetite (art gallery) opens.
 El Faro Towers built.
 2006 – March: Aníbal Ibarra deposed; Jorge Telerman becomes Chief of Government of city.
 2007 – Mauricio Macri becomes Chief of Government of city.
 2008
 Fortabat Art Collection opens.
 Repsol-YPF Tower built.
 2009 – Le Parc Figueroa Alcorta and Mulieris Towers built.

2010s
 2010
 Municipal bicycle sharing program established.
 Metropolitan Police department established.
 Population: 2,891,082.
 2011
 24 July: 2011 Copa América Final football tournament held.
 Metrobus begins operating.
 City named World Book Capital by UNESCO.
 2012
 22 February: Train crash.
 4 April: F2 
 2013
Jorge Mario Cardinal Bergoglio, Cardinal, Archbishop of Buenos Aires, is elected as Pope Francis, succeeding the retired Pope Benedict XVI
 April: Flooding.
  opens.
 2015
3 June: The feminist movement Ni una menos organizes its first massive demonstrations against gender-based violence, popularising the campaign throughout Argentina and several Latin American countries.
 2016
 Population: 13,879,707 (urban agglomeration).
 2017
 Alvear Tower completed as the tallest building in Argentina.

2020s
 2023
 A specialized exhibition recognised by the Bureau International des Expositions will be held.

See also
 Buenos Aires history
 
 Barrios and Communes of Buenos Aires
 List of mayors and chiefs of government of Buenos Aires
 Landmarks in Buenos Aires
 Timeline of Argentine history

References

This article incorporates information from the Spanish Wikipedia.

Bibliography

Published in the 18th–19th centuries

Published in the 20th century
 
 
 
 
 
 
 
 
 
 
 
 
 
 J. R. Scobie. (1972) "Buenos Aires as a commercial-bureaucratic city, 1880-1919: characteristics of a city's orientation." Amer. Historical Rev. 77, 4: 1035–1073.
 Alonso, Paula. 1993. "Politics and Elections in Buenos Aires, 1890–1898: The Performance of the Radical Party." Journal of Latin American Studies 25 (3): 465–487.
 Jose Moya. Cousins and Strangers: Spanish Immigrants in Buenos Aires, 1850–1930. Berkeley: University of California Press, 1998

Published in the 21st century

External links

 
Buenos Aires
buenos aires
Years in Argentina
Buenos Aires
Buenos Aires